The Mull of Kintyre is the southwesternmost tip of the Kintyre Peninsula (formerly Cantyre) in southwest Scotland. From here, the Antrim coast of Northern Ireland is visible on a calm and clear day, and a historic lighthouse, the second commissioned in Scotland, guides shipping in the intervening North Channel. The area has been immortalised in popular culture by the 1977 hit song "Mull of Kintyre" by Kintyre resident Paul McCartney's band of the time, Wings.

Etymology
The name is an anglicisation of the Gaelic Maol Chinn Tìre, in English: "The rounded [or bare] headland of Kintyre", where chinn and tìre are the genitive forms of ceann head and tìr land, country respectively. The English variant Cantyre derives from the phrase ceann tìre  "head land".

Mull as a geographical term is most commonly found in southwest Scotland, where it is often applied to headlands or promontories, and, often more specifically, for the tip of that promontory or peninsula.

The term mull derives from  "bald, bare, baldness, bareness". The geographical reference is to a land formation bare of trees, such as a rounded hill, summit, mountain, promontory or headland.

Geography
It is about  beyond the southernmost village of the peninsula, Southend with its tea room and beaches, and reached via a single-track road.

Ailsa Craig and the County Antrim coast of Ulster and Rathlin Island are all clearly visible from the Mull. On clearer days it is also possible to make out Malin Head in Inishowen in County Donegal in the west of Ulster, and the Ayrshire coast on the other side of Ailsa Craig. Other islands in the Firth of Clyde are also visible when looking east, especially from further back along the single track road from Southend village. The Straits of Moyle (part of the North Channel) allow sea passage from the Irish Sea to the Atlantic Ocean. Notoriously strong currents plague the tip of the Kintyre Peninsula creating a hazard to unmotorised craft and virtually impossible for distance swimmers. Owing to the low elevation of Rathlin Island and the high elevation of the Mull of Kintyre it is also possible to see over the top of Rathlin Island to the Antrim coastal town of Ballycastle. Individual houses on the Antrim coast and cars travelling along the coast road can sometimes be seen without the aid of binoculars, visibility conditions depending.

History
The Mull has been an important landbridge throughout history. It is thought that it was used by early humans in their travels from continental Europe to Ireland via Scotland. In more recent times it was used again by the Scotti when they travelled from Ireland to establish the kingdom of Dál Riata in modern-day Argyll.

Air crashes
The steep cliffs and hills rising out of the sea on all sides, along with the frequent sea mists, have made the area a hazard to flight. It has been the site of numerous air crashes throughout aviation history, and the remains of some of those crashed aircraft still litter the area.

A notable air disaster on the Mull was the RAF Chinook helicopter crash on 2 June 1994.

Nautical disaster
On 13 June 1858 the SS New York, a steamship converted to sail, was wrecked at the south end of the Mull of Kintyre.

Mull of Kintyre test

The Mull of Kintyre test or Mull of Kintyre rule is, according to an urban legend, an unofficial guideline that was used by the British Board of Film Classification (BBFC) in the United Kingdom to decide whether an image of a penis could be shown. According to the myth, the BBFC would not permit the general release of a film or video if it depicted a phallus erect to the point that the angle it made from the vertical was higher than that of the Kintyre peninsula, Argyll and Bute, on maps of Scotland. The BBFC has denied that any such 'test' existed, and maintain it is merely a humorous rumour.

Lighthouse

See also

 British Isles fixed sea link connections – which details infrastructure proposals involving the mull.

References

Headlands of Scotland
Kintyre
Landforms of Argyll and Bute